Garga may refer to:

Places
 Garga, Republic of Buryatia, a rural locality in Russia
 Garga, Iran, a village in Iran
 Garga, Burkina Faso, a village in Niou Department, Burkina Faso
 Garga (river), a river in Italy

Other uses
 Garga (sage), ancient Indian sage and the author of a Rigveda hymn
 Vrddha Garga, ancient Indian astrologer and astronomer
 Garga (gotra), a Hindu gotra
 Garga (skipper), a genus of butterflies
 Garga, a fictional character in the Future Card Buddyfight collectible card game

People with the name 
 Bhagwan Das Garga, Indian documentary filmmaker
 Garga Haman Adji, Cameroonian politician

See also 
 Gargah
 Garg (disambiguation)
 Gargar (disambiguation)
 Gargas (disambiguation), several places in France
 Gargya (disambiguation)